The 2009-10 Villanova Wildcats men's basketball team represented Villanova University in the 2009–10 NCAA Division I men's basketball season. Villanova was led by head coach Jay Wright. The Wildcats participated in the Big East Conference and played their home games at The Pavilion with some select home games at the Wachovia Center. They finished the season 25–8, 13–5 in Big East play. They were eliminated in the quarterfinals of the 2010 Big East men's basketball tournament by Marquette. They received an at-large bid to the 2010 NCAA Division I men's basketball tournament, earning a 2 seed in the South Region, where they were upset by 10 seed Saint Mary's in the second round.

Class of 2009 

|-
| colspan="7" style="padding-left:10px;" | Overall Recruiting Rankings:     Scout – 2     Rivals – 3      ESPN – 3 
|}

Preseason 
The Villanova Wildcats come back from a 2008–09 season which had a record of 30-8 (13-5) with the season ending in the school's 4th appearance in the Final Four.

Season overview

November 19–22, 2009 Puerto Rico Tip-Off

November 19, 2009 vs. George Mason (2-1) 

Isaiah Armwood hit the game-winning 3-pointer with 13.3 seconds left as the Wildcats survived to advance in Puerto Rico. It was Armwood's first shot attempt of the game and first career made field goal.

Villanova won its 17th straight games against unranked non-conference teams and improved to 4-0 all-time against George Mason.

November 20, 2009 vs. #18 Dayton (2-1) 

Corey Fisher led all scorers with 18 points, and was 10 for 12 from the free-throw line. He has made 24 free throws in his last two games. Villanova has won nine of their last 11 games against ranked teams.

November 22, 2009 vs. Mississippi (4-1) 

Villanova used an 8–0 run in the opening minutes Sunday night and led 27–23 at halftime, holding the Rebels (4-1) to only 29.6 percent shooting from the field. Antonio Pena dominated down low with a career-high 16 rebounds and tied his career high with 17 points. It's his third double-double in five games; he had just one in 72 career games prior to this season. Scottie Reynolds scored 18 of his season-high 21 points after halftime.

Ole Miss earned its first-ever NCAA tournament win by defeating Villanova 72–70 in 1999—the only previous meeting between the schools. The Wildcats improved to 32–7 in November under coach Jay Wright (since 2001) as they won the championship game of the Puerto Rico Tip-Off.

December 6, 2009 vs. Maryland (5-3) 

at BB&T Classic - Verizon Center, Washington, D.C.
 Game time: 7:30 PM EDT
 Game attendance: 16,389
 Televised: Fox Sports

The Wildcats set a school record by attempting 39 shots from behind the arc, making 16—one short of the school mark. Corey Stokes led the way, going 5 for 11 from 3-point range as part of an 18-point performance. Villanova took 41 shots compared to only 25 for Maryland, thanks heavily to a 22-15 rebounding advantage that included 12 on the offensive end.

December 9, 2009 vs. Saint Joseph's (3-5) 

at The Palestra, Philadelphia, PA
 Game time: 9:00 PM EDT
 Game attendance: 8,722
 Televised: ESPN2

The Holy War is a rivalry game in the Philadelphia Big 5 between Saint Joseph's University and Villanova University, which is considered the most intense of all the Big 5 games. Recent games between the two schools have been played in February during ESPN's Rivalry Week, either at the Palestra on the campus of the University of Pennsylvania when Saint Joseph's hosts the game, or at The Pavilion when Villanova is the host.

Nova is 9-0 for the first time since 2005-06 (started 8-0 last season). The 38 points were the most given up by the Wildcats in an opening half this season. Villanova converted 30 of 31 second-half free throw attempts, including 29 in a row, to win for the 43rd time in 57 meetings against the Hawks (3-5). The Wildcats have 21 of its last 22 Big 5 games dating back to the 2004–05 season.

Scottie Reynolds led the team with 22 points. He's averaged 19.7 points, 6.3 rebounds and 6 assists over his last three games. Former Duke transfer Taylor King scored a season-high 20 points off the bench.

January 6, 2010 vs. DePaul(7-8) 

at The Pavilion, Villanova, PA
 Game time: 8:00 PM EDT
 Game attendance: 6,500
 Televised: ESPN

Scottie Reynolds logged 21 points and Maalik Wayns added 18, as No. 6 Villanova jumped all over Big East foe DePaul in a 99–72 rout at The Pavilion. Corey Fisher donated 16 points and Reggie Redding scored 12. Redding and Fisher added seven and six assists, respectively, in the blowout.

Villanova did welcome back center Mouphtaou Yarou for the first time since Nov. 16 after he was out due to medical reasons. Yarou started the first two games but was sidelined before a November tournament in Puerto Rico. Yarou scored four points. Nine players had already scored for Villanova only 5 minutes into the second half.

The Wildcats ended up hitting 61.3 percent from the field in the first half en route to a comfortable 49-24 cushion, and the Blue Demons never seriously threatened in the final 20 minutes.

January 9, 2010 vs. Marquette (10-6) 

at The Pavilion, Villanova, PA
 Game time: 2:00 PM EDT
 Game attendance: 6,500
 Televised: ESPN

Villanova led by as many as 22 points, but nearly lost as Marquette cut the lead to two points with 27 seconds left. Corey Stokes led five Wildcat players in double figures with 16 points.

Scottie Reynolds scored 15 points and dished out four assists for the Wildcats (14-1, 3-0 Big East), who have won five straight since losing to Temple on December 13. Antonio Pena and Corey Fisher both finished with 11 points for Villanova, 10 points and five rebounds from Reggie Redding.

With the win, the Wildcats' win streak reached 35 straight games at the Pavilion—the longest streak in the building's history. Marquette lost its fourth consecutive game against Villanova and its eighth straight road game against a ranked opponent.

January 11, 2010 vs. Louisville (12-5) 

at Freedom Hall, Louisville, KY
 Game time: 7:00 PM EDT
 Game attendance: 20,006
 Televised: ESPN

Both teams entered the first Big Monday of the season with undefeated conference play and it was a game marked by 44 turnovers, 67 fouls and 94 free throws. Villanova trailed by as many as 17 points in the first half but rallied to improve to 7–1 on the road this season. Louisville had a "White Out" in effect at Freedom Hall, which means Louisville coach Rick Pitino did his best to dress like a young Col. Sanders. Nova had lost the previous three matchups.

There were 29 turnovers, 31 fouls and 34 free throws in the opening 20 minutes, which took more than an hour to complete. Scottie Reynolds scored 16 of his season-high 36 points over the final 6:05. It was his fifth career 30-point game and all have come on the road. King and Corey Fisher finished with 12 points each, while Wayns added 11.

After the game, Reynolds was reported saying, "It was basically two separate games. Same thing with Marquette. If I knew [why], it would never happen to us. Against a team like that, you have to make basketball plays. You have to play with your instincts. It's like they had seven guys out there. In practice, we had six."

January 17, 2010 vs. #11 Georgetown (13-3) 

at Wachovia Center, Philadelphia, PA
 Game time: 12:00 PM EDT
 Game attendance: 20,016
 Televised: SNY

Villanova held off Georgetown's comeback attempt and improved to 16-1 overall and 5–0 in the Big East. They are currently tied for 1st in the Big East with the Pitt Panthers. It's the Wildcats' best conference start since 2002–03, when they also started 5–0.

The game bogged down for a long part of the second half as the teams combined to miss 20 straight shots from the field over a 6:12 span. Scottie Reynolds scored 27 points, topping 20 points for the eighth time in his last 10 games. Redding and Wayns both had 11 points for Villanova. The Wildcats hadn't beaten Georgetown since a 56–52 triumph on January 8, 2007. The teams will also meet February 6 in Washington, DC.

2009-10 Schedule and results

Rankings

Roster

References 

Villanova Wildcats
Villanova Wildcats men's basketball seasons
Villanova Wildcats
Villanova Wildcats men's basketball team
Villanova Wildcats men's basketball team